Pietro Cascella (February 2, 1921 – May 18, 2008) was an Italian sculptor. His principal work consisted of 
large monumental sculptures, including the International Monument to the Victims of Fascism in the Auschwitz II-Birkenau death camp in Poland (1957–1967), and an underground mausoleum for Silvio Berlusconi at his villa in Arcore in the 1980s.

Life 
Cascella was born into a family of artists in Pescara on February 2, 1921. His father was Tommaso Cascella, a painter and ceramicist, and his mother was Susanna Federman. His elder brother  was a sculptor. Two of his uncles were also artists, the painter Michele Cascella and painter and ceramicist Gioacchino Cascella, as was his grandfather, the painter, ceramicist, and lithographer Basilio Cascella. In 1945 he married Anna Maria Cesarini Sforza, an artist. From 1977 he lived with his second wife, in the mediaeval  in the comune of Fivizzano, above Carrara. He died in Pietrasanta in 2008.

Work 

In the late 1930s he moved to Rome and studied at the Accademia di Belle Arti under Ferruccio Ferrazzi, who taught both painting and sculpture. He had work in the Quadriennale di Roma painting exhibition of 1943, and in the twenty-fourth Biennale di Venezia in 1948. He also participated in the twenty-eighth Biennale in 1956.

In about 1949 he and his wife Cesarini Sforza were commissioned to create mosaics for the third-class waiting-room of the Stazione Termini, the principal railway station of Rome. In 1950, the two completed a large mosaic for a Roman cinema, the Cinema America. At about this time he also made small-scale reliefs in various materials, some of them drawing inspiration from the work of Roberto Matta, who was a friend.

In 1950–1953 some ceramic work was included in the large American exhibition Italy at Work: Her Renaissance in Design Today.

In 1962 his work was included in an exhibition of ceramics at the Galleria dell’Obelisco in Rome. He had a solo show at the Galleria del Milione in Milan in the same year, and another at the Galería Bonino in New York. In the following year, and again in 1972, he had a room at the Biennale. In 1968 his work was shown at the Galèrie du Dragon in Paris and at the Musée d'Ixelles in Brussels. In 1971 Cascella participated in the twenty-third  in Paris.

In April 2006 he received the Italian Medal of Merit for Culture and Art.

References 

1921 births
2008 deaths
People from Pescara
20th-century Italian painters
Italian male painters
21st-century Italian painters
20th-century Italian sculptors
20th-century Italian male artists
Italian male sculptors
21st-century Italian sculptors
Italian contemporary artists
21st-century Italian male artists